Ohr ("Ear") was an influential German electronic/experimental record label set up by Rolf-Ulrich Kaiser in 1970.

Ohr released the debut albums of Tangerine Dream and Klaus Schulze.

History
The first five Ohr releases featured sleeves by Reinhard Hippen, all with dismembered baby doll parts as a central aspect of the imagery. These were Tangerine Dream's Electronic Meditation, Bernt Witthüser's Lieder von Vampiren..., Embryo's Opal, Floh de Cologne's FliesbandbabysBeatShow, and Limbus 4's Mandalas.

Other releases included Klaus Schulze, Ash Ra Tempel, Cosmic Jokers, Guru Guru, Popol Vuh, Sergius Golowin, Amon Düül, Birth Control, Witthüser & Westrupp, and numerous others. The Ohr office in New York City was run by Neil Kempfer-Stocker.

Kaiser also set up the label Pilz for more folkish/ethnic releases – such as Popol Vuh, Wallenstein and Hoelderlin. Further to this, he also set up the Cosmic Couriers label for more space-rock type releases – Cosmic Jokers, Ash Ra Tempel, Manuel Gottsching, et al.

Brain Records was set up when two disgruntled A&R men left Ohr to start their own label, taking Guru Guru with them.

Discography

Albums

Singles

See also 
 List of record labels
 List of electronic music record labels

References

External links
 Ohr discographies

German record labels
Electronic music record labels
Progressive rock record labels
Record labels established in 1970